April 8 - Eastern Orthodox liturgical calendar - April 10

All fixed commemorations below are observed on April 22 by Eastern Orthodox Churches on the Old Calendar.

For April 9th, Orthodox Churches on the Old Calendar commemorate the Saints listed on March 27.

Saints

 Martyrs Fortunatus, Donatus, twelve virgins, and six laymen, at Sirmium (304)
Martyr Eupsychius of Caesarea in Cappadocia (362)
 Hieromartyrs Desan the Bishop, the Priest Mariabus, Martyr Abdiesus and 270 others, martyrs of Persia under Shapur II (362)
 Venerable Hieromartyr Bademus (Vadim), Archimandrite, of Persia, and 7 disciples (379)
 Venerable Acacius of Amida, Bishop of Amida in Mesopotamia (5th century)

Pre-Schism Western saints

 Martyrs of Pannonia, seven virgin-martyrs in Sirmium in Pannonia.
 Martyrs of North-West Africa, a group of Christians martyred in Masyla.
 Saint Marcellus, Bishop of Die, celebrated for miracles (474) 
 Saint Madrun (Materiana), a saint from Wales or Cornwall to whom some Welsh churches are dedicated (5th century)
 Saint Dotto, Abbot of a monastery in the Orkney Islands off the coast of Scotland (6th century)
 Saint Waltrude  (Woutruide, Waldetrudis, Vaudru), monastic foundress at Bergen (Netherlands), renowned for holiness of life and miracles (688) 
 Saint Hugh of Rouen (Hugh of Champagne), Bishop of Rouen and then of Paris, and was also Abbot of Fontenelle and Jumièges (730)
 Saint Hedda and Companions, Abbot of Peterborough in England, martyred by the Danes (869) 
 Saint Theodore and Companions, Abbot of Crowland in England, martyred by the Danes (869) 
 Saint Casilda of Toledo, an anchoress near Briviesca near Burgos (1050)

Post-Schism Orthodox saints

 Newly Revealed Martyrs Raphael (Archimandrite), Nicholas (Deacon), Irene (child), and Eleni (who was also called Susanna) of Lesbos, and those with them (1463) 
 Hieromartyr Misael, Archbishop of Ryazan and Murom (1655)

New martyrs and confessors

 New Martyr Gabriel Fomin (1942)

Other commemorations

 Translation of the holy relics of Saint Monica of Tagaste to Rome.

Icon gallery

Notes

References

Sources
 April 9 / April 22. Orthodox Calendar (pravoslavie.ru).
 April 22 / April 9. Holy Trinity Russian Orthodox Church (A parish of the Patriarchate of Moscow).
 April 9. OCA - The Lives of the Saints.
 The Autonomous Orthodox Metropolia of Western Europe and the Americas. St. Hilarion Calendar of Saints for the year of our Lord 2004. St. Hilarion Press (Austin, TX). p. 27.
 April 9. Latin Saints of the Orthodox Patriarchate of Rome.
 The Roman Martyrology. Transl. by the Archbishop of Baltimore. Last Edition, According to the Copy Printed at Rome in 1914. Revised Edition, with the Imprimatur of His Eminence Cardinal Gibbons. Baltimore: John Murphy Company, 1916. p. 100.
 Rev. Richard Stanton. A Menology of England and Wales, or, Brief Memorials of the Ancient British and English Saints Arranged According to the Calendar, Together with the Martyrs of the 16th and 17th Centuries. London: Burns & Oates, 1892. pp. 150–151.
Greek Sources
 Great Synaxaristes:  9 Απριλίου. Μεγασ Συναξαριστησ.
  Συναξαριστής. 9 Απριλίου. ecclesia.gr. (H Εκκλησια Τησ Ελλαδοσ). 
Russian Sources
  22 апреля (9 апреля). Православная Энциклопедия под редакцией Патриарха Московского и всея Руси Кирилла (электронная версия). (Orthodox Encyclopedia - Pravenc.ru).
  9 апреля (ст.ст.) 22 апреля 2013 (нов. ст.) . Русская Православная Церковь Отдел внешних церковных связей.

April in the Eastern Orthodox calendar